The  were a class of small submarines designed for the Imperial Japanese Navy (IJN). They were first deployed in 1945, but never saw combat. The Ha-201's were designed from the outset to have high underwater speed and were based on the earlier Submarine No.71 prototype.

Design and description
At the end of 1944, the Imperial Japanese Navy decided it needed large numbers of high-speed coastal submarines to defend the Japanese Home Islands against an anticipated Allied invasion (named Operation Downfall by the Allies). To meet this requirement, the Ha-201-class submarines were designed as small, fast submarines incorporating many of the same advanced ideas implemented in the German Type XXI and Type XXIII submarines. They were capable of submerged speeds of almost .

The Ha-201 class displaced  surfaced and  submerged. For surface running, the submarines were powered by a single  diesel engine that drove one propeller shaft. When submerged the propeller was driven by a  electric motor. They could reach  on the surface and  submerged. Their armament consisted of two  torpedo tubes with four torpedoes and a single mount for a 7.7-millimeter machine gun.

Construction
The Japanese planned to build 79 Ha-201-class submarines (Submarines No. 4911 through 4989) under the Maru Sen Programme, prefabricating large sections of the boats, then completing them on the slipway. This was an ambitious goal considering the U.S. bombing campaign, which disrupted Japanese production, and by the time hostilities ceased on 15 August 1945 the Japanese had laid down only 22 submarines and completed only ten.

Service

None of the submarines made operational patrols. Except for one submarine that was wrecked, the Allies after the war  scuttled all the submarines that had been completed as well as all the incomplete ones that had been launched. Those which remained on the building ways at the end of the war were scrapped incomplete.

Boats

Footnotes

See also
Comparable submarines
German Type XXIII submarine
I-201 class submarine
Vessel Number 71

Bibliography
, History of Pacific War Vol.17 I-Gō Submarines, Gakken (Japan), January 1998, 
Rekishi Gunzō, History of Pacific War Extra, "Perfect guide, The submarines of the Imperial Japanese Forces", Gakken (Japan), March 2005, 
The Maru Special, Japanese Naval Vessels No.43 Japanese Submarines III, Ushio Shobō (Japan), September 1980, Book code 68343-43
The Maru Special, Japanese Naval Vessels No.132 Japanese Submarines I "Revised edition", Ushio Shobō (Japan), February 1988, Book code 68344-36
Ships of the World special issue Vol.37, History of Japanese Submarines, (Japan), August 1993

Ha-201
Ha-201
Japan campaign